Alejandro Martín Bordonaro (born 20 April 1988 in Córdoba, Argentina) is an Argentine professional footballer who plays as a forward for Almagro.

Clubs
 Universitario de Córdoba 1999–2002
 General Paz Juniors 2003–2006
 Cádiz B 2006–2007
 Banco de Córdoba 2008–2009
 José Gálvez 2010
 Central Norte 2011–2012
 San Lorenzo de Alem 2012–2014
 Villa San Carlos 2014
 Ferro Carril Oeste 2015
 Unión La Calera 2015
 Almagro 2016–2017
 San Lorenzo de Alem 2017–

References
 
 

1988 births
Living people
Argentine footballers
Association football forwards
Cádiz CF B players
General Paz Juniors footballers
Ferro Carril Oeste footballers
Club Atlético Villa San Carlos footballers
José Gálvez FBC footballers
Central Norte players
Unión La Calera footballers
Club Almagro players
Chilean Primera División players
Argentine expatriate footballers
Argentine expatriate sportspeople in Chile
Expatriate footballers in Chile
Argentine expatriate sportspeople in Peru
Expatriate footballers in Peru
Argentine expatriate sportspeople in Spain
Expatriate footballers in Spain
Footballers from Córdoba, Argentina